The Surgeon General of the United States Army is the senior-most officer of the U.S. Army Medical Department (AMEDD). By policy, the Surgeon General (TSG) serves as Commanding General, U.S. Army Medical Command (MEDCOM) as well as head of the AMEDD. The surgeon general's office and staff are known as the Office of the Surgeon General (OTSG) and are located in Falls Church, Virginia.

Since 1959, TSG has been appointed in the grade of lieutenant general. By law, TSG may be appointed from any of the six officer branches of the AMEDD. However, prior to the 43rd Surgeon General, Lt. Gen. Patricia Horoho — an Army Nurse Corps officer — all appointed and confirmed surgeons general have been Medical Corps officers — military physicians. The incumbent Surgeon General is medical administrator Lieutenant General R. Scott Dingle, a Medical Service Corps officer. The 44th Army Surgeon LTG Nadja West retired on July 19, 2019.

Duties
As a commanding general, TSG provides advice and assistance to the Chief of Staff, Army (CSA) and to the Secretary of the Army (SECARMY) on all health care matters pertaining to the U.S. Army and its military health care system. The incumbent is responsible for development, policy direction, organization and overall management of an integrated Army-wide health service system and is the medical materiel developer for the Army. These duties include formulating policy regulations on health service support, health hazard assessment and the establishment of health standards.  is assisted by the Deputy Surgeon General.

History

Congress established the Medical Service of the Continental Army on July 27, 1775, and placed a "Chief physician & director general" of the Continental Army as its head. The first five surgeons general of the U.S. Army served under this title. An Act of Congress of May 28, 1789, established a "Physician general" of the U.S. Army. Only two physicians, doctors Richard Allison and  James Craik, served under this nomenclature. A Congressional Act of March 3, 1813, cited the "Physician & surgeon general" of the U.S. Army. That nomenclature remained in place until the Medical Department was established  by the Reorganization Act of April 14, 1818. Additionally, physicians assigned to the U.S. Army were not accorded military rank until 1847.

Surgeons General of the U.S. Army and their precursors

Note: The AMEDD Museum at Fort Sam Houston, San Antonio, Texas, has a display on the Army Surgeons General, including images of each one, except for Dr. Richard Allison.

Agencies, centers, offices, and programs within the OTSG

Military Vaccine Agency (MILVAX)
Borden Institute
U.S. Army Medical Information Technology Center (USAMITC)
Army Human Research Protections Office (AHRPO)
Pharmacovigilance Center

See also

Library of the Surgeon General's Office, now the National Library of Medicine
Medical Corps (United States Army)
Surgeon General of the United States
Surgeon General of the United States Navy
Surgeon General of the United States Air Force

Further reading

References and notes

Heitman, Francis B. (1903), Historical Register and Dictionary of the United States Army, from Its Organization, September 29, 1789, to March 2, 1903; Washington, DC: Government Printing Office; 2 vol. (Vol. 1, pp 41–42 details the Medical Department.)

External links

 
 OTSG Portal
 Surgeon General Consultant Program
 The Surgeons General of the U.S. Army and Their Predecessors at the Office of Medical History, OTSG Website
 
 

Military medicine in the United States
 

Surgeon
1813 establishments in the United States